Baku is the capital and largest city of Azerbaijan, as well as the largest city on the Caspian Sea and of the Caucasus region. Baku lies on the southern shore of the Absheron Peninsula, on the Bay of Baku. Baku's urban population was estimated at two million people as of 2009. Baku is the primate city of Azerbaijan—it is the sole metropolis in the country, and about 25% of all inhabitants of the country live in Baku's metropolitan area.

Baku is divided into twelve administrative raions and 48 townships. The Inner City of Baku, along with the Shirvanshah's Palace and Maiden Tower, were designated as a UNESCO World Heritage Site in 2000.

The city is the scientific, cultural, and industrial centre of Azerbaijan. Many sizeable Azerbaijani institutions have their headquarters there.  In recent years, Baku has become an important venue for international events. It hosted the 57th Eurovision Song Contest in 2012, the 2015 European Games, 4th Islamic Solidarity Games, the European Grand Prix in 2016, the Azerbaijan Grand Prix since 2017, the final of the 2018–19 UEFA Europa League, and was one of the host cities for UEFA Euro 2020. The Baku International Sea Trade Port is capable of handling two million tonnes of general and dry bulk cargoes per year.

Baku is renowned for its harsh winds, reflected in its nickname, the "City of Winds".

Etymology
Baku is long attested under the Perso-Arabic name باکو (Bākū). Early Arabic sources also refer to the city as Bākuh and Bākuya, all of which seem to come from a Persian name. The further etymology is unclear.

A popular etymology in the 19th century considered it to be derived from Persian بادکوبه (Bâd-kube, meaning "wind-pounded city", a compound of bād, "wind", and kube, which is rooted in the verb کوبیدن kubidan, "to pound", thus referring to a place where wind would be strong and pounding, as is the case of Baku, which is known to experience fierce winter snow storms and harsh winds). This popular name (Badkubə in modern Azerbaijani script) gained currency as a nickname for the city by the 19th century (e.g., it is used in Akinchi, volume 1, issue 1, p. 1), and is also reflected in the city's modern nickname as the "City of Winds". Another and even less probable folk etymology explains the name as deriving from Baghkuy, meaning "God's town". Baga (now بغ bagh) and kuy are the Old Persian words for "god" and "town" respectively; the name Baghkuy may be compared with Baghdād ("God-given") in which dād is the Old Persian word for "give".

During Soviet rule, the city was spelled in Cyrillic as "Бакы" in Azerbaijani (while the Russian spelling was and still is "Баку"). (See also Azerbaijani alphabet.)

History

Antiquity

Around 100,000 years ago, savanna rich in flora and fauna covered the territory of present-day Baku and Absheron. Traces of human settlement go back to the Stone Age. Bronze-Age rock carvings have been discovered near Bayil, and a bronze figure of a small fish in the territory of the Old City. These have led some to suggest the existence of a Bronze-Age settlement within the city's territory. Near Nardaran, a place called Umid Gaya features a prehistoric observatory, where images of the sun and of various constellations are carved into rock together with a primitive astronomic table. Further archeological excavations have revealed various prehistoric settlements, native temples, statues and other artifacts within the territory of the modern city and around it.

In the 1st century AD, the Romans organised two Caucasian campaigns and reached what is today Baku. Near the city, in what is today Gobustan, Roman inscriptions dating from AD 84 to 96 survive – some of the earliest written evidences for a city there.

Rise of the Shirvanshahs and the Safavid era

Baku was the realm of the Shirvanshahs during the 8th century AD. The city frequently came under assault from the Khazars and (starting from the 10th century) from the Rus'. Shirvanshah Akhsitan I built a navy in Baku and successfully repelled a Rus' assault in 1170. After a devastating earthquake struck Shamakhi, the capital of Shirvan, Shirvanshah's court moved to Baku in 1191.

The Shirvan era greatly influenced Baku and the remainder of present-day Azerbaijan. Between the 12th and 14th centuries, massive fortifications were built in Baku and the surrounding towns. The Maiden Tower, the Ramana Tower, the Nardaran Fortress, the Shagan Castle, the Mardakan Castle, the Round Castle and also the famous Sabayil Castle on the island of the Bay of Baku date from this period. The city walls of Baku were also rebuilt and strengthened.

By the early 16th century Baku's wealth and strategic position attracted the attention of its larger neighbours; in the previous two centuries, it was under the rule of the Iran-centred Kara Koyunlu and Ak Koyunlu. The fall of the Ak Koyunlu brought the city immediately into the sphere of the newly formed Iranian Safavid dynasty, led by king (shah) Ismail I. Ismail I laid siege to Baku in 1501 and captured it; he allowed the Shirvanshahs to remain in power, under Safavid suzerainty. His successor, king Tahmasp I, completely removed the Shirvanshahs from power and made Baku a part of the Shirvan province. Baku remained as an integral part of his empire and of successive Iranian dynasties for the next centuries, until ceded to the Russian Empire through the 1813 Treaty of Gulistan. The House of Shirvan, which had ruled Baku since the 9th century, was extinguished in the course of Safavid rule.

At this time the city was enclosed within lines of strong walls, which were washed by the sea on one side and protected by a wide trench on land. The Ottomans briefly gained control over Baku as a result of the Ottoman-Safavid War of 1578–1590; by 1607, it came under Iranian control again. In 1604 Shah Abbas I destroyed Baku fortress.

Baku had a reputation as a focal point for traders from all across the world during the Early modern period,; commerce was active and the area prospered. Notably, traders from the Indian subcontinent established themselves in the region. These Indian traders built the Ateshgah of Baku during 17th–18th centuries; the temple was used as a Hindu, Sikh, and Zoroastrian place of worship.

Downfall of the Safavids and the Khanate of Baku 
The Safavids temporarily lost power in Iran in 1722; Emperor Peter the Great of Russia took advantage of the situation and invaded.  As a result of the Russo-Persian War of 1722–1723, the Safavids were forced to cede Baku to Russia. By 1730 the situation had deteriorated for the Russians; the successes of Nader Shah led them to sign the Treaty of Ganja near Ganja on 10 March 1735, ceding the city and all other conquered territories in the Caucasus back to Iran.

The eruption of instability following Nader Shah's death in 1747 gave rise to the various Caucasian khanates. The semi-autonomous Persian-ruled Baku Khanate (1747–1806) was one of these. Initially ruled by Mirza Muhammed Khan, it soon became a dependency of the much stronger Quba Khanate. During this time, the population of Baku remained small (approximately 5,000), and the economy suffered as a result of constant warfare.

Russo-Persian Wars and Iran's forced cession 

From the late 18th century, Imperial Russia switched to a more aggressive geopolitical stance towards its two neighbours and rivals to the south, namely Iran and the Ottoman Empire. In the spring of 1796, by Catherine II's order, General Valerian Zubov's troops started a large campaign against Qajar Persia. Zubov had sent 13,000 men to capture Baku, and it was overrun subsequently without any resistance. On 13 June 1796, a Russian flotilla entered Baku Bay, and a garrison of Russian troops was stationed inside the city. Later, however, Emperor Paul I of Russia ordered the cessation of the campaign and the withdrawal of Russian forces following the death of his predecessor, Catherine the Great. In March 1797 the tsarist troops left Baku and the city became part of Qajar Iran again.

In 1813, following the Russo-Persian War of 1804–1813, Qajar Iran had to sign the Treaty of Gulistan with Russia this provided for the cession of Baku and of most of Iran's territories in the North Caucasus and South Caucasus to Russia. During the next and final bout of hostilities between the two, the Russo-Persian War of 1826–1828, the Iranians briefly recaptured Baku. However, the militarily superior Russians ended this war with a victory as well, and the resulting Treaty of Turkmenchay (1828) made Baku's inclusion in the Russian Empire definite. When Baku was occupied by the Russian troops during the war of 1804–13, nearly the entire population of some 8,000 people was ethnic Tat. Baku within Russia was the administrative center of the Baku Uyezd, Baku Governorate, and the Baku Gradonachalstvo.

Discovery of oil 

The Russians built the first oil-distilling factory in Balaxani in 1837. The first person to drill oil in Baku was an ethnic Armenian Ivan Mirzoev, who is also known as a 'founding father of Baku's oil industry.' Digging for oil began in the 1840s, with the first oil well drilled in the Bibi-Heybat suburb of Baku in 1846. It was mechanically drilled, though a number of hand-dug wells pre-dated it. Large-scale oil exploration started in 1872 when Russian imperial authorities auctioned parcels of oil-rich land around Baku to private investors. The pioneer of oil extracting from the bottom of the sea was the Polish geologist Witold Zglenicki. Soon after, investors appeared in Baku, including the Nobel Brothers in 1873 and the Rothschilds in 1882. An industrial area of oil refineries, better known as Black Town, developed near Baku by the early 1880s.

Professor A. V. Williams Jackson of Columbia University wrote in his work From Constantinople to the Home of Omar Khayyam (1911):

By the beginning of the 20th century, half of the oil sold in international markets was extracted in Baku. The oil boom contributed to the massive growth of Baku. Between 1856 and 1910 Baku's population grew at a faster rate than that of London, Paris or New York.

Unrest at the time of the 1905 Revolution resulted in massacres among the population and the destruction of many oil facilities.

World War I 

In 1917, after the October Revolution and amidst the turmoil of World War I and the breakup of the Russian Empire, Baku came under the control of the Baku Commune, led by the veteran Bolshevik Stepan Shahumyan. Seeking to capitalize on the existing ethnic conflicts, by spring 1918, Bolsheviks inspired and condoned civil war in and around Baku. During the famous March Days of 1918, Bolsheviks and Dashnaks, seeking to establish control over Baku streets, faced armed Azerbaijani groups. The Azerbaijanis suffered defeat from the united forces of the Baku Soviet and were massacred by Dashnak teams in what was called the March Days. An estimated 3,000–12,000 Azerbaijanis were killed in their own capital. After the massacre, on 28 May 1918, the Azerbaijani faction of the Transcaucasian Sejm proclaimed the independence of the Azerbaijan Democratic Republic (ADR) in Ganja, thereby founding the first Muslim-majority democratic and secular republic. The newly independent Azerbaijani republic, being unable to defend the independence of the country on their own, asked the Ottoman Empire for military support in accordance with clause 4 of the treaty between the two countries. Shortly after, Azerbaijani forces, with support of the Ottoman Army of Islam led by Nuru Pasha, started their advance on Baku, eventually capturing the city from the loose coalition of Bolsheviks, SRs, Dashnaks, Mensheviks and British forces under the command of General Lionel Dunsterville on 15 September 1918.

After the Battle of Baku of August–September 1918, the Azerbaijani irregular troops, with the tacit support of the Turkish command, conducted four days of pillaging and killing 10,000–30,000 Armenians of Baku. This pogrom became known as the "September Days". Shortly after this, Baku was proclaimed the new capital of the Azerbaijan Democratic Republic.

The Ottoman Empire, recognising defeat in World War I by October 1918, signed the Armistice of Mudros with the British (30 October 1918); this meant the evacuation of Turkish forces from Baku. Headed by General William Thomson, some 5,000 British troops, including parts of the former Dunsterforce, arrived in Baku on 17 November. Thomson declared himself military governor of Baku and implemented martial law in the city until "the civil power would be strong enough to release the forces from the responsibility to maintain the public order". British forces left before the end of 1919.

Soviet period 
The independence of the Azerbaijani republic was a significant but short-lived chapter in Baku's history. On 28 April 1920, the 11th Red Army invaded Baku and reinstalled the Bolsheviks, making Baku the capital of the Azerbaijan Soviet Socialist Republic.

The city underwent many major changes. As a result, Baku played a great role in many branches of Soviet life. Baku was the major oil city of the Soviet Union. From about 1921 the city was headed by the Baku City Executive Committee, commonly known in Russian as Bakgorispolkom. Together with Baku Party Committee (known as the Baksovet), it developed the economic significance of the Caspian metropolis. From 1922 to 1930 Baku became the venue for one of the major trade fairs of the Soviet Union, serving as a commercial bridgehead to Iran and the Middle East.

World War II 

The major powers continued to note Baku's growing importance as a major energy hub. During World War II (1939–1945) and particularly during the 1942 Nazi German invasion of the southwestern Soviet Union, Baku became of vital strategic importance to the Axis powers. In fact, capturing the oil fields of Baku was a primary goal of the Wehrmacht's Operation Edelweiss, carried out between May and November 1942.

Fall of the Soviet Union and later 
After the 1991 dissolution of the Soviet Union, Baku embarked on a process of restructuring on a scale unseen in its history. Thousands of buildings from the Soviet period were demolished to make way for a green belt on its shores; parks and gardens were built on the land reclaimed by filling up the beaches of the Baku Bay. Improvements were made in general cleaning, maintenance, and garbage collection to bring these services up to Western European standards. The city is growing dynamically and developing at full speed on an east–west axis along the shores of the Caspian Sea. Sustainability has become a key factor in future urban development.

Geography 

Baku is situated on the western coast of Caspian Sea. In the vicinity of the city there are a number of mud volcanoes (Keyraki, Bogkh-bogkha, Lokbatan and others) and salt lakes (Boyukshor, Khodasan and so on).

Climate 
Baku has a temperate semi-arid climate (Köppen climate classification: BSk) with hot and humid summers, cool and occasionally wet winters, and strong winds all year long. However, unlike many other cities with such climate features, Baku does not see extremely hot summers and substantial sunshine hours. This is largely because of its northerly latitude and the fact that it is located on a peninsula on the shore of the Caspian Sea.

Baku, and the Absheron Peninsula on which it is situated, is the most arid part of Azerbaijan (precipitation here is around or less than  a year). This is largely due to the rain shadow effect from the Caucasian Mountains, with corresponding latitudes on the Black Sea on average receiving  or more. The majority of the light annual precipitation occurs in seasons other than summer, but none of these seasons is particularly wet.

During Soviet times, Baku, with its long hours of sunshine and dry healthy climate, was a vacation destination where citizens could enjoy beaches or relax in now-dilapidated spa complexes overlooking the Caspian Sea. The city's past as a Soviet industrial centre left it one of the most polluted cities in the world, .

At the same time Baku is noted as a very windy city throughout the year, hence the city's nickname the "City of Winds", and gale-force winds, the cold northern wind khazri and the warm southern wind gilavar are typical here in all seasons. Indeed, the city is renowned for its fierce winter snow storms and harsh winds.
The speed of the khazri sometimes reaches 144 km/h (89 mph), which can cause damage to crops, trees and roof tiles.

The daily mean temperature in July and August averages , and there is very little rainfall during that season. During summer the khazri sweeps through, bringing desired coolness. Winter is cool and occasionally wet, with the daily mean temperature in January and February averaging . During winter the khazri sweeps through, driven by polar air masses; temperatures on the coast frequently drop below freezing and make it feel bitterly cold. Winter snow storms are occasional; snow usually melts within a few days after each snowfall.

Administrative divisions 
Baku is divided into 12 rayonlar (sub-rayons) (administrative districts) and 5 settlements of city type.

 Binagadi (Binəqədi) raion
 Garadagh (Qaradağ) raion
 Khatai (Xətai) raion
 Khazar (Xəzər) raion
 Narimanov (Nərimanov) raion
 Nasimi (Nəsimi) raion
 Nizami raion
 Pirallahi (Pirallahı) raion
 Sabail (Səbail) raion
 Sabunchu (Sabunçu) raion
 Surakhani (Suraxanı) raion
 Yasamal raion

Demographics 
Until 1988, Baku had very large Russian, Armenian, and Jewish populations which contributed to cultural diversity and added in various ways (music, literature, architecture and progressive outlook) to Baku's history. With the onset of the First Nagorno-Karabakh War and the pogrom against Armenians starting in January 1990, the city's large Armenian population was expelled.
Under Communism, the Soviets took over the majority of Jewish property in Baku and Kuba. After the collapse of the Soviet Union, Azerbaijani President Heydar Aliyev returned several synagogues and a Jewish college, nationalised by the Soviets, to the Jewish community; he encouraged the restoration of these buildings. Seven of the original 11 synagogues, including the Gilah synagogue, built in 1896, and the large Kruei Synagogue, were renovated.

Ethnic groups 

Today, the vast majority of Baku's population is made up of ethnic Azerbaijanis, and the rest are Talysh, Russians, Lezgi and others. The intensive growth of the population started in the middle of the 19th century when Baku was a small town with a population of about 7,000 people. The population increased again from about 13,000 in the 1860s to 112,000 in 1897 and 215,000 in 1913, making Baku the largest city in the Caucasus region.

Baku has been a cosmopolitan city at certain times during its history, meaning ethnic Azerbaijanis did not constitute the majority of population. In 2003 Baku additionally had 153,400 internally displaced persons and 93,400 refugees.

Religion 

The religion with the largest community of followers is Islam. The majority of the Muslims are Shia Muslims, and the Republic of Azerbaijan has the second highest Shia population percentage in the world after Iran. The city's notable mosques include Juma Mosque, Bibi-Heybat Mosque, Muhammad Mosque and Taza Pir Mosque.

There are some other faiths practised among the different ethnic groups within the country. By article 48 of its Constitution, Azerbaijan is a secular state and ensures religious freedom. Religious minorities include Russian Orthodox Christians, Catholic Levantines, Georgian Orthodox Christians, Albanian-Udi Apostolic Christians, Lutherans, Ashkenazi Jews and Sufi Muslims. Baku is the seat of the Catholic Apostolic Prefecture of Azerbaijan.

Zoroastrianism, although extinct in the city as well as in the rest of the country by the present time, had a long history in Azerbaijan and the Zoroastrian New Year (Nowruz) continues to be the main holiday in the city as well as in the rest of Azerbaijan.

Economy 

Baku's largest industry is petroleum, and its petroleum exports make it a large contributor to Azerbaijan's balance of payments. The existence of petroleum has been known since the 8th century. In the 10th century, the Arabian traveler, Marudee, reported that both white and black oil were being extracted naturally from Baku. By the 15th century, oil for lamps was obtained from hand-dug surface wells.
Commercial exploitation began in 1872, and by the beginning of the 20th century the Baku oil fields were the largest in the world. Towards the end of the 20th century, much of the onshore petroleum had been exhausted, and drilling had extended into the sea offshore. By the end of the 19th century skilled workers and specialists flocked to Baku. By 1900 the city had more than 3,000 oil wells, of which 2,000 were producing oil at industrial levels. Baku ranked as one of the largest centres for the production of oil industry equipment before World War II. The World War II Battle of Stalingrad was fought to determine who would have control of Baku oil fields. Fifty years before the battle, Baku produced half of the world's oil supply.

The oil economy of Baku is undergoing a resurgence, with the development of the massive Azeri-Chirag-Guneshli field (Shallow water Gunashli by SOCAR, deeper areas by a consortium led by BP), development of the Shah Deniz gas field, the expansion of the Sangachal Terminal and the construction of the BTC Pipeline.

The Baku Stock Exchange is Azerbaijan's largest stock exchange, and largest in the Caucasian region by market capitalization. A relatively large number of transnational companies are headquartered in Baku. One of the more prominent institutions headquartered in Baku is the International Bank of Azerbaijan, which employs over 1,000 people. International banks with branches in Baku include HSBC, Société Générale and Credit Suisse.

Tourism and shopping 
Baku is one of the most important tourist destinations in the Caucasus, with hotels in the city earning 7 million euros in 2009. Many sizable world hotel chains have a presence in the city. Baku has many popular tourist and entertainment spots, such as the downtown Fountains Square, the One and Thousand Nights Beach, Shikhov Beach and Oil Rocks. Baku's vicinities feature Yanar Dag, an ever-blazing spot of natural gas. On 2 September 2010 with the inauguration of National Flag Square, Baku set the world record for tallest flagpole; on 24 May 2011, the city of Dushanbe in Tajikistan set a new record with a -higher flagpole. A few years later, the Flag Pole was dismantled and the National Flag Square was closed off with fences.

Baku has several shopping malls; the most famous city centre malls are Port Baku, Park Bulvar, Ganjlik Mall, Metro Park, 28 MALL, Aygun city and AF MALL. The retail areas contain shops from chain stores up to high-end boutiques.

The city is listed 48th in the 2011 list of the most expensive cities in the world conducted by the Mercer Human Resource Consulting. Its Nizami Street and also the Neftchilar Avenue are among the most expensive streets in the world.

Culture 
In 2007 the Heydar Aliyev Cultural Centre, designed by Pritzker Prize-winning architect Zaha Hadid, was opened. Baku also has many museums such as Baku Museum of Modern Art and Azerbaijan State Museum of History, most notably featuring historical artifacts and art. Many of the city's cultural sites were celebrated in 2009 when Baku was designated an Islamic Culture Capital. Baku was chosen to host the Eurovision Dance Contest 2010. It has also become the first city hosting the first European Games in 2015.

Theatres 

 Azerbaijan State Academic Opera and Ballet Theatre
 Azerbaijan State Academic Drama Theatre
 Azerbaijan State Russian Drama Theatre named after Samad Vurgun
 Baku Puppet Theatre (formally Azerbaijan State Puppet Theatre named after Abdulla Shaig)
 Azerbaijan State Theatre of Young Spectators
 Azerbaijan State Theatre of Musical Comedy
 Baku State Circus
 "Oda" Theatre
 Baku Marionette Theatre
 Baku Municipal Theatre
 Azerbaijan State Pantomime Theatre
 Mugham Azerbaijan National Music Theatre
 Azerbaijan State Theatre of Song named after Rashid Behbudov
 "UNS" Theatre
 "Yugh" Theatre

Among Baku's cultural venues are Azerbaijan State Philharmonic Hall, Azerbaijan State Academic Opera and Ballet Theatre. The main movie theatre is Azerbaijan Cinema. Festivals include Baku International Film Festival, Baku International Jazz Festival, Novruz Festival, Gül Bayramı (Flower Festival) and the National Theater Festival. International and local exhibitions are presented at the Baku Expo Centre.

, the city along with Ganja and Lankaran participates in Earth Hour movement.

Museums

 The Museum Centre
 Museum of Archaeology and Ethnography
 Azerbaijan State Carpet Museum
 Azerbaijan Museum of Geology

Libraries
 National Library of Azerbaijan
 ANAS Central Library of Science
 Presidential Library (former Library of the Armenian Philanthropic Society)

Architecture 

Baku has wildly varying architecture, ranging from the Old City core to modern buildings and the spacious layout of Baku port. Many of the city's landmarks were built during the early 20th century, when architectural elements of the European styles were combined in eclectic style. Baku has an original and unique appearance, earning it a reputation as the 'Paris of the East'. Baku joined UNESCO's Network of Creative Cities as a Design City on 31 October 2019 on the occasion of World Cities' Day.

Hamams 

There are a number of ancient hamams in Baku dating back to the 12th, 14th and 18th centuries. Hamams play a very important role in the architectural appearance of Baku.

Teze Bey Hamam 
Teze Bey is the most popular hamam (traditional bath) in Baku. It was built in 1886 in the centre of Baku and in 2003 it was fully restored and modernised. Along with its modern amenities, Teze Bey features a swimming pool and architectural details inspired by Oriental, Russian and Finnish baths.

Gum Hamam 
Gum Hamam was discovered during archaeological excavations underneath the sand; hence the name: Gum hamam (sand bath). It was built sometime during the 12th–14th centuries.

Bairamali hamam 
In ancient times Bairamali Hamam was called "Bey Hamam". The original structure was built sometime during the 12th–14th centuries and was reconstructed in 1881.

Agha Mikayil Hamam 
Agha Mikayil Hamam was constructed in the 18th century by Haji Agha Mikayil on Kichik Gala Street in the Old City (Icherisheher). It is still operating in its ancient setting. The Hamam is open to women on Mondays and Fridays and to men on the other days of the week.

Modern architecture 
Late modern and postmodern architecture began to appear in the early 2000s. With economic development, old buildings such as Atlant House were razed to make way for new ones. Buildings with all-glass shells have appeared around the city, the most prominent examples being the International Mugham Center, Azerbaijan Tower, Heydar Aliyev Cultural Centre, Flame Towers, Baku Crystal Hall, Baku White City, SOCAR Tower and DENIZ Mall. These projects also caught the attention of international media as notable programmes such as Discovery Channel's Extreme Engineering did pieces focusing in on changes to the city.

The Old City of Baku, also known as the Walled City of Baku, refers to the ancient Baku settlement. Most of the walls and towers, strengthened after the Russian conquest in 1806, survived. This section is picturesque, with its maze of narrow alleys and ancient buildings: the cobbled streets past the Palace of the Shirvanshahs, two caravansaries, the baths and the Juma Mosque (which used to house the Azerbaijan National Carpet and Arts Museum but is now a mosque again). The old town core also has dozens of small mosques, often without any particular sign to distinguish them as such.

In 2003, UNESCO placed the Inner City on the List of World Heritage in Danger, citing damage from a November 2000 earthquake, poor conservation as well as "dubious" restoration efforts. In 2009 the Inner City was removed from the List of World Heritage in Danger.

Visual arts 

The three main institutions for exhibiting modern and contemporary art in Baku are:
 Baku Museum of Modern Art
 Heydar Aliyev Centre
 Yarat Contemporary Art Space

Music and media 

The music scene in Baku can be traced back to ancient times and villages of Baku, generally revered as the fountainhead of meykhana and mugham in the Azerbaijan.

In recent years, the success of Azerbaijani performers such as AySel, Farid Mammadov, Sabina Babayeva, Safura and Elnur Hüseynov in the Eurovision Song Contest has boosted the profile of Baku's music scene, prompting international attention. Following the victory of Azerbaijan's representative Eldar & Nigar at the Eurovision Song Contest 2011, Baku hosted the Eurovision Song Contest 2012.

2005 was a landmark in the development of Azerbaijani jazz in the city. It has been home to legendary jazz musicians like Vagif Mustafazadeh, Aziza Mustafa Zadeh, Rafig Babayev and Rain Sultanov. Among Baku's prominent annual fairs and festivals is Baku International Jazz Festival, which features some of the world's most identifiable jazz names.

Baku also has a thriving International Centre of Mugham, which is located in Baku Boulevard, Gulustan Palace and Buta Palace, one of the principal performing arts centres and music venues in the city.

The majority of Azerbaijan's media companies (including television, newspaper and radio, such as, Azad Azerbaijan TV, Ictimai TV, Lider TV and Region TV) are headquartered in Baku. The films The World Is Not Enough and The Diamond Arm are set in the city, while Amphibian Man includes several scenes filmed in Old City.

The city's radio stations include: Ictimai Radio, Radio Antenn, Burc FM, Avto FM, ASAN Radio and Lider FM Jazz

Some of Baku's newspapers include the daily Azadliq, Zaman (The Time), Bakinskiy Rabochiy (Baku Worker), Echo and the English-language Baku Today.

Baku is also featured in the video game Battlefield 4.

Nightlife 
Many clubs that are open until dawn can be found throughout the city. Clubs with an eastern flavour provide special treats from the cuisine of Azerbaijan along with local music. Western-style clubs target younger, more energetic crowds. Most of the public houses and bars are located near Fountains Square and are usually open until the early hours of the morning.

Baku is home to restaurants catering to every cuisine and occasion. Restaurants range from luxurious and expensive to ordinary and affordable.

Parks and gardens 

Baku has large sections of greenery either preserved by the National Government or designated as green zones. The city, however, continues to lack a green belt development as economic activity pours into the capital, resulting in massive housing projects along the suburbs.

Baku Boulevard is a pedestrian promenade that runs parallel to Baku's seafront. The boulevard contains an amusement park, yacht club, musical fountain, statues and monuments. The park is popular with dog-walkers and joggers and is convenient for tourists. It is adjacent to the newly built International Centre of Mugham and the musical fountain.

Other parks and gardens include Heydar Aliyev Park, Samad Vurgun Park, Narimanov Park, Alley of Honor and the Fountains Square. The Martyrs' Lane, formerly the Kirov Park, is dedicated to the memory of those who died during the Nagorno-Karabakh conflict and also to the 137 people killed on Black January.

Sports 

 Baku hosts a Formula One race on the Baku City Circuit. The first was the 2016 European Grand Prix, with the track going around the old city. The track measures 6.003 km (3.735 mi), and it has been on the Formula One calendar since its 2016 debut.

The city also hosted three group games and one quarter-final of the UEFA Euro 2020 European Football Championship.

Since 2002, Baku has hosted 36 major sporting events and selected to host the 2015 European Games. Baku is also to host the fourth edition of the Islamic Solidarity Games in 2017.

Baku is also one of world's leading chess centres, having produced famous grandmasters like Teimour Radjabov, Vugar Gashimov, Garry Kasparov, Shahriyar Mammadyarov and Rauf Mammadov, as well as the arbiter Faik Hasanov. The city also annually hosts the international tournaments such as Baku Chess Grand Prix, President's Cup, Baku Open and bidding to host 42nd Chess Olympiad in 2014.

First class sporting facilities were built for the indoor games, including the Palace of Hand Games and Heydar Aliyev Sports and Exhibition Complex. It hosted many sporting events, including FIFA U-17 Women's World Cup, Rhythmic Gymnastics European Championships in 2007 and 2009, 2005 World Rhythmic Gymnastics Championships, 2007 FILA Wrestling World Championships and 2010 European Wrestling Championships, 2011 World Amateur Boxing Championships, 2009 Women's Challenge Cup and European Taekwondo Championships in 2007. Since 2011 the city annually hosts WTA tennis event called Baku Cup.

The Synergy Baku Cycling Project participates in the Tour d'Azerbaïdjan a 2.2 multi-stage bicycle race on the UCI Europe Tour.

Baku made a bid to host the 2016 Summer Olympics and 2020 Summer Olympics, but failed to become a Candidate City both times.

The largest sports hub in the city is Baku Olympic Stadium with 69,870 seating capacity whose construction was completed in 2015. UEFA Europa League Final 2019 was played at the Olympic Stadium in Baku on 29 May 2019 between English sides Chelsea and Arsenal. The city's main football clubs is Neftçi Baku of who first has nine Premier League titles making Neftchi the most successful Azerbaijani football club. Baku also has several football clubs in the premier and regional leagues, including AZAL and Ravan in Premier League. The city's second largest stadium, Tofiq Bahramov Stadium hosts a number of domestic and international competitions and was the main sports centre of the city for a long period until the construction of Baku Olympic Stadium.

In the Azerbaijan Women's Volleyball Super League, Baku is represented by Rabita Baku, Azerrail Baku, Lokomotiv Baku and Azeryol Baku.

Transport 

Throughout history the transport system of Baku used the now-defunct horsecars, trams and narrow gauge railways. , 1,000 black cabs are ordered by Baku Taxi Company, and as part of a programme originally announced by the Transport Ministry of Azerbaijan, there is a plan to introduce London cabs into Baku. The move was part of £16 million agreement between Manganese Bronze subsidiary LTI Limited and Baku Taxi Company.

Local rail transport includes the Baku Funicular and the Baku Metro, a rapid-transit system notable for its art, murals, mosaics and ornate chandeliers. Baku Metro was opened in November 1967 and includes 3 lines and 25 stations at present; 170 million people used Baku Metro over the past five years. In 2008, the Chief of Baku Metro, Taghi Ahmadov, announced plans to construct 41 new stations over the next 17 years. These will serve the new bus complex as well as the international airport. In 2019, the Baku suburban railway opened.

BakuCard is a single Smart Card for payment on all types of city transport. The intercity buses and metro use this type of card-based fare-payment system.

Baku Railway Station is the terminus for national and international rail links to the city. The Kars–Tbilisi–Baku railway, which directly connects Turkey, Georgia and Azerbaijan, began to be constructed in 2007 and opened in 2017. The completed branch will connect Baku with Tbilisi in Georgia, and from there trains will continue to Akhalkalaki, and Kars in Turkey.

Sea transport is vital for Baku, as the city is practically surrounded by the Caspian Sea to the east. Shipping services operate regularly from Baku across the Caspian Sea to Turkmenbashi (formerly Krasnovodsk) in Turkmenistan and to Bandar Anzali and Bandar Nowshar in Iran. The commuter ferries, along with the high-speed catamaran Seabus (Deniz Avtobusu), also form the main connection between the city and the Absheron peninsula.

Baku Port was founded in 1902 and claims to be the largest Caspian Sea port. It has six facilities: the main cargo terminal, the container terminal, the ferry terminal, the oil terminal, the passenger terminal and the port fleet terminal. The port's throughput capacity reaches 15 million tonness of liquid bulk and up to 10 million tons of dry cargoes. In 2010, the Baku International Sea Trade Port began to be reconstructed. The construction was planned to take place in three stages and to be completed by 2016. The estimated costs were US$400 million. From April to November Baku Port is accessible to ships loading cargoes for direct voyages from Western European and Mediterranean ports. The State Road M-1 and the European route E60 are the two main motorway connections between Europe and Azerbaijan. The motorway network around Baku is well developed and is constantly being extended.
The Heydar Aliyev International Airport is the only commercial airport serving Baku. The new Baku Cargo Terminal was officially opened in March 2005. It was constructed to be a major cargo hub in the CIS countries and is actually now one of the biggest and most technically advanced in the region. There are also several smaller military airbases near Baku, such as Baku Kala Air Base, intended for private aircraft, helicopters and charters.

Education 

Baku State University, the first established university in Azerbaijan was opened in 1919 by the government of the Azerbaijan Democratic Republic. In the early years of the Soviet era, Baku already had Azerbaijan State Oil Academy, Azerbaijan Medical University and Azerbaijan State Economic University. In the post-WWII period, a few more universities were established such as Azerbaijan Technical University, Azerbaijan University of Languages and the Azerbaijan Architecture and Construction University. After 1991 when Azerbaijan gained independence from the Soviet Union, the fall of communism led to the development of a number of private institutions, including Qafqaz University and Khazar University which are considered the most prestigious academic institutions. Apart from the private universities, the government established the Academy of Public Administration, the Azerbaijan Diplomatic Academy and various military academies. The largest universities according to the student population are Baku State University and Azerbaijan State Economic University. In addition, there are the Baku Music Academy and the Azerbaijan National Conservatoire in Baku established in the early 1920s. Publicly run kindergartens and elementary schools (years 1 through 11) are operated by local wards or municipal offices.

The Azerbaijan National Academy of Sciences, the main state research organisation in Azerbaijan is locating in Baku as well. Moreover, Baku has numerous libraries, many of which contain vast collections of historic documents from the Roman, Byzantine, Ottoman and Soviet periods, as well as from other civilisations of the past. The most important libraries in terms of historic document collections include the Nizami Museum of Azerbaijan Literature, the National Library of Azerbaijan, the Mirza Alakbar Central Library, the Samad Vurgun Library and Baku Presidential Library.

Secondary schools 
 Elite Gymnasium

Health care 
According to the Ministry of Healthcare, healthcare facilities in Baku are "highly developed compared with the regions and doctors are waiting to work there, The regions, meanwhile, lack both doctors and clinics providing specialized medical treatment." Resulting in citizens travelling for many hours to Baku to receive adequate medical treatment.

Notable residents

International relations

Twin towns and sister cities 
Baku is twinned with:[in chronological order]

Partner cities 
  Mainz, Germany
  Paris, France 
  Vienna, Austria
  Tbilisi, Georgia 
  Astana, Kazakhstan 
  Minsk, Belarus 
  Moscow, Russia
  Volgograd, Russia
  Kizlyar, Russia
  Tashkent, Uzbekistan
  Chengdu, China

See also 

 Baku Gradonachalstvo
 1920 Baku Congress
 Alexander III visit to Baku
 Administrative divisions of Azerbaijan
 List of cities in Azerbaijan
 Mingachevir
 Nakhchivan
 Sumgait

Notes

References

External links 

 
 Baku's profile at the Organization of World Heritage Cities website
 UNESCO World Heritage Site listing Walled City of Baku
 

 
Capitals in Asia
Cities and towns in Azerbaijan
Populated coastal places in Azerbaijan
Districts of Azerbaijan
Port cities in Azerbaijan
Port cities and towns of the Caspian Sea
World Heritage Sites in Azerbaijan
Weather extremes of Earth
Populated places along the Silk Road